Ascidiimonas is a Gram-negative, curved-rod-shaped, strictly aerobic and chemoheterotrophic genus of bacteria from the family of Flavobacteriaceae with one known species (Ascidiimonas aurantiaca). Ascidiimonas aurantiaca has been isolated from a sea squirt.

References

Flavobacteria
Bacteria genera
Monotypic bacteria genera
Taxa described in 2016